The Cardiff accent, also known as Cardiff English, is the regional accent of English, and a variety of Welsh English, as spoken in and around the city of Cardiff, and is somewhat distinctive in Wales, compared with other Welsh accents. Its pitch is described as somewhat lower than that of Received Pronunciation, whereas its intonation is closer to dialects of England rather than Wales.

It is estimated that around 500,000 people speak Cardiff English. The accent is generally limited to inside the city's northern boundary, rather than extending to the nearby South Wales Valleys where the spoken variety of English is different. However, the accent area spreads east and west of the city's political borders, covering much of the former counties of South Glamorgan and south-west Gwent, including Newport and coastal Monmouthshire.

The dialect developed distinctively as the city grew in the nineteenth century, with an influx of migrants from different parts of Britain and further afield. The Cardiff accent and vocabulary has been influenced in particular by those who moved there from the English Midlands, the West Country, other parts of Wales, and Ireland.  The Survey of English Dialects did not cover Cardiff but it did survey nearby Newport and six small villages in Monmouthshire.

Influence
The formation of the modern Cardiff accent has been cited as having an Irish influence, similar to the influence of Liverpool's Scouse accent, given both cities' status as major world ports. According to a 2005 BBC study, the Cardiff accent, as well as that of Liverpool and East London, is in the process of changing due to the modern influence of immigration on youth, primarily of Arabic and Hindustani influence.

Social variation
Research has shown that there is a great sociolinguistic variation on the Cardiff accent, that is to say, a difference in the way people speak from different social backgrounds in Cardiff. Unsurprisingly, those from a more affluent background generally speak with a less broad accent, closer to that of standard English, compared with people from a working-class background. Thus, the city itself has different dialects, with people from the less affluent eastern and western districts of the city having a stronger and broader accent than those living in the more affluent north Cardiff.

Phonetics and phonology

Cardiff English shares many phonetic traits with the English spoken in the Severnside area of England, but differs in being non-rhotic. A notable characteristic in the accent is the lack of rounding lips when pronouncing consonants and vowels. While in Received Pronunciation, lip-rounding is a common feature to distinguish vowels, in Cardiff English this is not often observed.

The tongue also holds a slightly different shape with people speaking in Cardiff English. The front is rigid and close to the alveolar ridge, while the back is relaxed, creating a large pharyngeal cavity. In continuous speech, the soft palate is also lowered, providing a slight nasal quality. Creaky voice is mainly absent and can only be found in prestigious middle-class varieties as in RP. The vocal folds are tenser than in Received Pronunciation, giving a husky, breathy sound to articulation, with the overall effect of greater resonance, tension and hoarseness makes the accent often thought of as being "harsh" or "unpleasant".

Place names in Cardiff, such as Crwys and Llanedeyrn, may be pronounced in a way which reflects rules of neither Welsh nor English.

Consonants
Consonants in CE share general similarities to that of Received Pronunciation. Unique characteristics of consonants of this accent include:

Sometimes, the stops may be realised as a pure fricative, such as  realised as  intervocallically. When not in initial position, these stops can also be glottalised in the manner of RP, although this becomes weaker in broader forms of the accent.
 glottalisation of  before , also in the  sequence (as in Canton) which is always pronounced with an alveolar plosive in RP.
 Flapping of  generally occurs between voiced phonemes. It can even be an approximant .
Furthermore, they are noticeably devoiced in final position.
 The fricatives  may have slightly sharper friction, especially before front vowels; on the other hand  may lack labialisation found in other accents.
 Realisation of  more often as an approximant rather than a fricative, and undergoes elision as mentioned below.
 G-dropping is common. Despite carrying out mild stigma, it can still carry prestige as it is heard in middle-class varieties of the accent.
 More common in younger working-class varieties, -thing is sometimes pronounced .
Intervocallically, there is a voiced allophone  such as ahead. Studies in the travel agency have been recorded that 'weak forms' are variably dropped, with these same group of people constantly dropping words like hotel (which are in turn preceded by an), emphasising its French origins.
This is also found to a degree in Ireland and American cities influenced by these accents such as Philadelphia and New York City.
 The broadest accents may realise  particularly as a tap  intervocalically and after the consonants . It can also sometimes be tapped word-initially. Otherwise, it is generally a postalveolar approximant .
 Like several northern English dialects, some words' final consonants may be devoiced, in words such as second or wardrobe. The conjunction and, when stressed and before a break, is also notably pronounced .
  is frequently a syllabic . Alternatively an  can be added before the consonant, otherwise the consonant may be vocalised as a close back vowel.
  is unrounded , especially before .
  is often debated as to whether it even should be considered as a phoneme in Cardiff English, as it is exclusively found in people of Welsh-speaking backgrounds or people who have patriotic sentiments to the Welsh language. Many speakers who do not pronounce a convincing  find it difficult or even possible anyway, so they would substitute it with either , in names such as Llewelyn, Llandaff.
  (Usually realised as  under Welsh influence), on the other hand, is more manifested as many speakers of the accent pronounce it in such as Castell Coch, Mynachdy, Pantbach, although that is not to say substitutions such as  exist.  can also be found in a few interjections of disgust, such as ugh or /.

Vowels

Much like RP, linking and intrusive R is present in Cardiff English, such as in drawing  or draw attention .

Unlike the consonants, CE's vowels are significantly different from Received Pronunciation. Many vowels in this accent have a more centralised articulation, as well as the starting points of most diphthongs, as seen below. Like mentioned above, at least the broad varieties seem to lack labialisation. However, if they are labialised, they are articulated with tight lips.

Monophthongs

 The  vowel is markedly closer and more front, generally having no glide, when compared to RP .
  is a somewhat more open , compared to typical RP, causing non-Cardiffians to interpret it as the  vowel. However, more modern RP speakers have a similar realisation as Cardiff.
 The weak vowel merger is variable, so that words such as anniversary  and elephant  often feature , rather than : . In broader speech, this can be replaced with : .
 Like ,  is also closer, somewhat advanced and generally has no glide found in RP  and several other British dialects.
  is a more open and slightly retracted  when compared to RP. Like in the diagram above, some may have their  vowel at the same height as this vowel, only differentiated by vowel length.
It is usually realised with strong rounding, even the broadest accents have at least a slight rounding. Accents in the general register have a close-mid tongue height.
  and  can be considered to belong to one phoneme , although some sources claim contrast otherwise, which is problematic as there are no minimal pairs between these two vowels. When stressed, it covers a wide allophonic variation as shown in the chart. It is typically open-mid or above, and much closer than RP. 
 The  vowel  is phonetically central . A similar vowel is used by younger speakers of RP instead of the traditional .
 Broad forms of Cardiff English use a centralised, unrounded and open-mid  , with higher-class accents having a closer vowel with strong rounding that is typical of RP. The horse–hoarse merger is present with younger speakers, although a preservation with some older speakers does exist.
  is one of the most characteristic vowels of the accents, generally being an open front vowel  and notably longer than Received Pronunciation. Regardless if neighbouring any nasal consonants, it is frequently nasalised itself; this has been linked to Merseyside velarised speech. The raising of this vowel has been stigmatised with local Cardiff culture, especially its city name Cardiff , as well as Cardiff Arms Park and a pint of dark, referring to the local brew Brains Dark. 
 The trap-bath split is variable among status, being the most used in higher-class forms of the accent due to social pressure of the influence of RP. Even so, the vowels may be conflated thus both variations can be produced even in succeeding sentences.
 The  vowel is unrounded and noticeably fronter than RP.

Diphthongs

Speakers also exhibit both the pane–pain and toe–tow merger, which contrasts with some other southern Welsh varieties.

  is a clear diphthong and has a more closer, centralised in-glide and a closer end point as opposed to RP. Very few older speakers may conservatively have very narrow glides (i.e. ), making it only as a potential diphthong.
Like ,  also has a closer end point than RP. The traditional pronunciation was more of a slight back diphthong .
 's in-glide is unrounded and more centralised compared to RP.

The sequence , when not coalesced in words like nude or you is  like many other Welsh accents.

Centring diphthongs do not exist. RP  is mostly a disyllabic sequence .

RP  vowel is either a disyllabic sequence  or merges with the  vowel .  almost always replaces the word sure; when after consonant +  (such as cure or pure), the use of  increases by class status. However, when without  (such as insure or tour), the upper middle class would use the  vowel less compared to other classes.

Furthermore, Cardiff English does not have smoothing, unlike RP, which is like other Welsh accents.

Intonation
The intonation of Cardiff English is generally closer to English accents rather than Welsh, but with a wider pitch range than in Received Pronunciation. Nevertheless, the average pitch is lower than other South Wales accents and RP. High rising terminal is also what characterises the dialect from RP, as well as consistency in intonation with strong expression; such as annoyance, excitement and emphasis.

Assimilation and elision
Like RP and a lot of other English dialects, Cardiff English is prone to constant assimilation and elision. It is the consistency and use of assimilation, even when speaking slowly, distinguishes CE from other English accents. It should also be noted that patterns found in other South Wales dialects are not found in Cardiff and instead is influenced by British accents.

  is commonly elided at the beginning of a word, e.g. that, there .  may also assimilate and be pronounced the same to these alveolar consonants  when preceding . Although a similar phenomenon exists in RP, it is much more common and may even carry out to stressed syllables, e.g.  all that , although  and in these .
However, there is no justification to be classified as an elided form of the full pronunciation, as there is no evidence of speakers analysing it as a clausal form with the pronoun it.
 Final  before another consonant is often elided, as in about four , but we , pocket money , started collecting  and United States . In high-frequency words, including at, bit, but, get, got, let, it, lot, out, quite, said and that, may also be elided before a vowel or a pause, as in but I  and that's right . Moreover, final  may be simplified to  not only before consonants like in RP, but also before vowels, as in don't drive  or can't handle .
 Intervocalically  is occasionally elided and lengthen the previous vowel, as in America  or very .
 Unstressed  are mainly elided for vowels, as in except police .

Grammar
Many of the grammatical features below are influenced from south-western dialects of England, particularly sharing with the dialect of Reading. Non-standard forms when associated with Cardiff often have a negative reaction since most dialects in Wales are influenced by Welsh.
 The Northern Subject Rule is a common feature of the colloquial Cardiff accent, which is the tendency to use a third-person singular verb conjugation for all pronouns in the present tense. Examples include I lives in Cardiff, we likes it, they squeaks when you walks. This can also extend to the irregular be and do, such as they's awful or we does it often, and sometimes with have (they never has homework).
 When have is used as an auxiliary, e.g. they have been, it is more likely to be elided as in they been, like many other colloquial or non-standard accents. Likewise, do as an auxiliary is used, as in they does try. In Reading, the third-person singular forms are used to a lesser extent, with have never being the case but do  occasionally. On the other hand, the form dos  does exist in Reading but is not attested in Cardiff except for the phrase fair dos 'give her/him due credit', which is analysed as a plural morpheme rather than an inflectional one.
 Conversely, an irregular verb conjugated with third-person singular pronoun can take a first-person singular verb conjugation, specifically with have, but also with do. Examples include she've gone, he do his work, it don't swim. Negative third-person forms of have are difficult to analyse as their forms can be heavily elided; forms such as hasn't, haven't or even ain't can be homophonous.
 The first and third singular past-tense forms of be, was can once again be found in all pronouns you was, we was, they was. However unlike Reading, were replacing standard was cannot be done except occasionally in negative forms (i.e. she weren't). Sometimes, this may be extended to other irregular verbs when that verb's past participle is the same or very similar as the infinitive form, as in he give a book, she come over here.
 Double negatives are also present as in some other urban accents of English, e.g. I haven't had nothin''', there isn't no-one in. Similarly never can also be used to negate the past tense in the same manner, as in I never did nothin.
 Them to mean 'those', as in He likes them cats, similar to other non-standard dialects.
 Lack of plurals on nouns of measurement, similar to other colloquial British accents, e.g. forty pound, seven foot long (also consider standard six foot five).
 Using adjectival forms for adverbs, such as shop local (found in many Cardiffian cornerstores), she drives lovely.
 Removal of prepositional particles when following adverbs, out for 'out of', over for 'over to/in', up for 'up at/in' etc.
 Nevertheless, non-standard particle compounds indicating position and direction are present, represented in where to. It mainly acts as a postposition as in where's that to?, however it can also be a preposition (where's to the keys?), although this can be non-standard (e.g. where to are you going? vs. where are you going to?).
 The positional and directional adjuncts here and there can be prefixed with by: by here and by there.
 Like other various urban accents, reflexive pronouns all use the possessive form as their base rather than the accusative, i.e. hisself for himself or theirselves for themselves. An alternative construction his/her mitt etc. is also used when referring to people, literally meaning 'his/her hand'.
 The discourse tag isn't it?/innit?, although stereotyped in Welsh English in especially rural areas, is commonly heard in Cardiff. It may simply be a function word, similar to isn't that so? or Northern Welsh yes? and can also interchange with standard don't/didn't they regardless of social class.
 Not found in other Welsh accents is predicate fronting, where the predicate is moved to the beginning of the sentence, i.e. hurt he was or awful I thought it sounded, which is influenced by Welsh. In standard English, this also occurs, although this is referred to as 'thematic fronting'.
 Juxtaposition with particles of different meaning in a sentence, e.g. I'll be over there now, in a minute.

Vocabulary
Cardiff generally shares its vocabulary with south-west Wales, although a lot of its naturalised vocabulary as well as Welsh loanwords from the area are lost and unrecognisable in Cardiff, specifically farming terms, which use is sparse in the city.

Nevertheless, these terms are still present to some degree in Cardiff:

 to clam (for) — to yearn, to die for (colloquial)
 dap — plimsole
 to dap — to bounce, or rarer to hit
 dap(per) — describes a person's height, usually of a small size (dap of a lad 'small boy') but can also refer to taller people (i.e. she's that dap) when specifying non-verbally
 dapping — only bouncing once and then catching it, by more specific sources
 half — an emphatic particle, e.g. s/he's half tidy, general approval expression; he don't half kid herself, 'he is pretentious/grandiose'.
 hopper — known by some as a tipping-grain container and not exactly a seed basket
 lush, cracking — great, fabulous, attractive
 off — unfriendly, hostile
 pine-end — used by a small amount to refer to the end of a gable
 pluddle — to puddle, occasionally used as in to puddle through a pool 'to walk through water'
 tidy — a general term of approval. It covers a variety of meanings including tidy looking 'nice-looking', tidy sort 'decent', tidy job 'job well done' etc. although some claim it has no direct equivalent in standard English

Notable speakers
The accent can be heard in varying degrees in the voices of Frank Hennessy, Charlotte Church, Colin Jackson, Craig Bellamy and Stan Stennett.

Opinions
A common first reaction to the accent is often that it is scarcely different from what is considered a "proper Welsh accent", which is usually seen by most outside Wales as being the variety spoken in the South Wales Valleys. The accent is also sufficiently distinct from standard English that researchers from the University of Birmingham have carried out research on the accent in an effort to improve speech recognition software.

The former Assembly First Minister Rhodri Morgan pointed out in a pamphlet of Cardiff that having a strong Cardiff accent has long been an issue of class, recalling how teachers at a Cardiff high school prepared pupils for the middle class professions by reciting: "Hark, hark the lark In Cardiff Arms Park!"''

In a survey, carried out by the BBC, Welsh accents are among the least popular accents in the UK. However, the Cardiff accent was rated higher than that of nearby Swansea.

In the 1960s, Gwyn Thomas, a Valleys man, described the speech of Cardiffians in the following way:

References

Bibliography

Further reading

External links
 BBC Voices
 Cardiff accent: Edith talks about community spirit in the old Tiger Bay area of Cardiff

Dialect
Welsh English
Languages of Wales
Welsh English
Dialects of English
City colloquials